In sociology and economics, the precariat is a neologism for a social class formed by people suffering from precarity, which means existing without predictability or security, affecting material or psychological welfare. The term is a portmanteau  merging precarious with proletariat.<ref>F. Lunning (2010).[https://books.google.com/books?id=5d0Q9fdinQUC&q=precariat+proletariat%27%27&pg=PA252 Mechademia 5: Fanthropologies]. University of Minnesota Press. p. 252. .</ref> 

Unlike the proletariat class of industrial workers in the 20th century who lacked their own means of production and hence sold their labor to live, members of the precariat are only partially involved in labor and must undertake extensive unremunerated activities that are essential if they are to retain access to jobs and to decent earnings.  
Classic examples of such unpaid activities include continually having to search for work (including preparing for and attending job interviews), as well as being expected to be perpetually responsive to calls for "gig" work (yet without being paid an actual wage for being "on call"). 

The hallmark of the precariat class is the condition of lack of job security, including intermittent employment or underemployment and the resultant precarious existence. The emergence of this class has been ascribed to the entrenchment of neoliberal capitalism.

Overview
Some theorists suggest that the young precariat class in Europe has become a serious issue in the early part of the 21st century. This has been linked with major mass political developments including the Brexit referendum in the UK, and the presidency of Donald Trump in the US. The global COVID-19 pandemic has particularly exacerbated food insecurity in the United States. A survey conducted by the European Council on Foreign Relations discovered that only one third of Germans and one quarter of Italians and French had enough money remaining at the end of the month for discretionary spending.

The British economist Guy Standing has analysed the precariat as a new emerging social class in work done for the think tank Policy Network and the World Economic Forum. In his 2014 book entitled A Precariat Charter he argued that all citizens have a right to socially inherited wealth. The latest in the series is titled The Precariat: The New Dangerous Class"Who will be a voice for the emerging precariat?", The Guardian, June 1, 2011. where he proposed basic income as a solution for addressing the problem.

The analysis of the results of the Great British Class Survey of 2013, a collaboration between the BBC and researchers from several UK universities, contended there is a new model of class structure consisting of seven classes, ranging from the Elite at the top to the Precariat at the bottom. The Precariat class was envisaged as "the most deprived British class of all with low levels of economic, cultural and social capital." This was contrasted with "the Technical Middle Class" in Great Britain in that instead of having disposable income but no interests, people of the new Precariat Class have all sorts of potential activities they like to engage in but cannot do any of them because they have no money, insecure lives, and are usually trapped in old industrial parts of the country.

The precariat class has been emerging in societies such as Japan, where it includes over two million so-called "freeters" who are unemployed and out of school. In the West, a similar group of people are called NEETs.

See also
 Dead-end job
 Endo contractualization
 Gig worker
 Involuntary unemployment
 McJob
 Policy Network
 Pre-distribution
 Precarious work
 Reserve army of labour
 Tang ping ("lying flat")
 Workforce casualisation

References

Further reading
 
 

External links

"Plutonomy and the Precariat" Noam Chomsky in the Huffington Post
We’re All Precarious Now. Jacobin'', April 20, 2015.
Cash, credits and crisis: life in the new European 'precariat' The Guardian, May 15, 2019

Precarious work
Economic sociology
Neologisms
Social classes